Tyler Allen (born November 15, 1987) is an American NASCAR race engineer. He is employed at Joe Gibbs Racing as the lead race engineer for the No. 20 NASCAR Cup Series Toyota Camry driven by Christopher Bell.  Allen has worked in NASCAR since 2012. In 2019 Allen and the Joe Gibbs Racing No. 18 Toyota Camry Team won the NASCAR Cup Series Championship with crew chief Adam Stevens and driver Kyle Busch.   Allen started his career with Venturini Motorsports in the ARCA Racing Series where he spent two years working as car chief on the No. 25 car driven by Brennan Poole and Alex Bowman.   Allen moved to RAB Racing where he was the race engineer for No. 99 Nationwide Series Toyota Camry driven by James Buescher.  Allen is a graduate of the University of Washington where he achieved a bachelor's degree in Mechanical Engineering and was part of the UW Formula SAE team for 4 years.

Early years
The Allen racing gene comes from his grandfather Robert Allen. "Grandpa Bob" had started racing in the 1950s on the small dirt tracks of California, ultimately ending up racing Hydroplanes in the Pacific Northwest which led him to a National Hydroplane Championship in 1983.  From a young age Allen was raised around the small tracks of the Pacific Northwest as his father Terry and two uncles Mike and John raced 1/2 sized stock cars.

In 2007 Allen was accepted to the University of Washington School of Mechanical Engineering.  As part of his engineering studies, he joined the UW Formula SAE team and was assigned to the suspension design team.  While attending school, Allen started Allen Racing and began driving Limited Late Model Stock cars. Allen competed for three years at South Sound Speedway where he completed his third year finishing second in points for the South Sound Limited Late Model championship. In 2010 Allen finished his racing in the Pacific Northwest competing at Evergreen Speedway in the NASCAR Whelen All-American Series.

Allen supported his racing working for ROMAC Industries where he was a Product Development Engineer responsible for the design, prototyping, component testing, manufacturing, production tooling development and cost analysis of a new product called the PIRANHA. Allen left ROMAC at the end of 2010 to move to North Carolina and pursue his dream of competing and winning in NASCAR.

Richard Petty Drivers Search II
In September 2010 Allen was chosen as part of the Richard Petty Driver Search I.  Allen competed against 12 other drivers from around the world for a chance to race in the ARCA Racing Series for Richard Petty Motorsports. Allen drove to a fifth overall finish, taking first in Mechanical and Marketing categories of the driving competition.

Move to North Carolina
Allen relocated to North Carolina to pursue working in NASCAR.  Allen was hired by Richard Petty Driving Experience as a driving instructor, where he traveled across the United States driving stock cars on some of the most famous race tracks in North America, including Charlotte Motor Speedway, Bristol Motor Speedway, Daytona Int'l Speedway, Atlanta Motor Speedway, and Las Vegas Motor Speedway. Allen worked with NASCAR stock car racing driver and crew chief Brad Noffsinger, who is currently lead instructor and head of driver development at Richard Petty Driving Experience. Allen supported Noffsigner's USAC Ford Focus Carolina Series team.

ARCA Racing Series
In late 2011 Allen went to work for Venturini Motorsports where he volunteered as a shop helper.  He was quickly hired and started work as a shop mechanic, fabricating and building race cars in preparation for the 2012 season.  Allen was assigned to Crew Chief Billy Venturini as Car Chief for the 2012 Season.  Allen led chassis setup plate, pull down rig analysis and simulation, including wind tunnel aerodynamic testing.  Allen was soon promoted to Car Chief working for Billy Venturini and driver Brennan Poole where they had a successful ARCA season with 2 wins, 3 poles, 5 top 5 and 15 top ten finishes.

NASCAR Nationwide/Xfinity Series
In 2012 Allen made his move to NASCAR where he was hired by RAB Racing with Brack Maggard as the race engineer for the #99 car driven by Alex Bowman. Allen was teamed up with veteran Crew Chief Chris Rice where they finished the 2012 season with two top 5s, five top 10s, and six top 15 finishes

Allen continued to develop his chassis set up skills at RAB Racing using static and dynamic vehicle testing procedures while developing and executing vehicle test plans that utilized pull down rigs, 8-Post Shaker, AVCS Rig and wind tunnel testing.  Allen worked closely with engineering resources from Toyota Racing Development (TRD) utilizing their vast resources and race experience to develop pre-season testing strategies using MoTec and PI OSIsoftreal time data capture and analysis. Matt Lucas took over as Crew Chief for James Buescher replacing Chris Rice who moved to NASCAR Camping World Truck Series.

In December 2014 Allen was hired by Joe Gibbs Racing as a race engineer on the #54 NASCAR Xfinity Series working for NASCAR crew chief Chris Gayle and driver Kyle Bush where they went on to win 5 poles and 6 wins and lead 1000 laps during the 2015 season.  In 2016 Allen moved to the Joe Gibbs #18 team again with driver Kyle Busch where they won 9 poles, 10 wins and lead over 2,000 laps.  NASCAR drivers that also drove the #54 and #18 in 2015 and 2016 included Boris Said, Bobby Labonte, Denny Hamlin, David Ragan, Owen Kelly, Drew Herring, and Matt Tift.

NASCAR Cup Series
In 2017 Allen moved up to the Joe Gibbs Racing Monster Energy NASCAR Cup Series No. 18 team with crew chief Adam Stevens and 2015 NASCAR Sprint Cup Series Champion Kyle Busch where from 2017 to 2020 the team went on to win 13 poles and 19 wins including the NASCAR Championship in 2019.  In 2021 Allen moved to the Joe Gibbs Racing No. 20 NASCAR Cup Series team as the lead race engineer for crew chief Adam Stevens and driver, Christopher Bell.

References

1987 births
Living people
NASCAR people
American motorsport people
People from Tacoma, Washington
University of Washington College of Engineering alumni